Pitipo District is one of six districts of the province Ferreñafe in Peru.

Places of interest
 Pómac Forest Historical Sanctuary

References